Gurit Kadman (b. March 2, 1897 - March 27, 1987) was an Israeli dance instructor and choreographer, and is considered the mother of Israeli folk dancing.

Biography 
Gertrude (Gert) Loewenstein (later Gurit Kadman) was born in Leipzig, Germany to an assimilated Jewish family that traced its roots to Prague. In her youth she was active in the Wandervogel German youth movement.

In 1919, she married Leo Kaufman, and the couple joined the Blau Weiss Zionist youth movement and began agricultural training in preparation for a communal life in Palestine. Her son, Raphael, was born before they left.

In 1920, they immigrated to Mandate Palestine and were among the founders of the communal settlement Heftziba, first near Hadera, where another son, Amnon, was born, and then at its permanent location in the Jezreel Valley. Later, they changed the family name to Kadman and Gert became Gurit.

In 1925, she accompanied her husband on an educational mission to Austria, where their daughter, Ayala, was born. Upon their return, Leo was employed by the Histadrut. In 1931, the family left the kibbutz and moved to Tel Aviv.

Awards and honors
 In 1981, she received the Israel prize, for dance.

Publications
 Am Roked (“A Dancing People”), 1964
 Ethnic Dance In Israel, 1982

See also 
List of Israel Prize recipients

References

External links
Details of all Gurit Kadman's dances

Israel Prize in dancing recipients
Israel Prize women recipients
German emigrants to Mandatory Palestine
19th-century German Jews
Israeli female dancers
Israeli choreographers
1897 births
1987 deaths
Folk dancers